In China, there are significantly fewer women than men, leading to an imbalanced population sex ratio resulting from cultural influences and government policy. This phenomenon is sometimes referred to as the missing women or missing girls of China. 

Female disadvantages in child survival throughout China reflects a long pattern of sex-based discrimination. Preferences for sons are common in China, owing to their ability to carry on family names, their wealth inheritance, and the idea that they are typically the ones to care for their parents once they are older. Limiting the ability for parents to have numerous children forces them to think of logical and long term reasons to have a male or female child. Chinese parents are known to favor large families, and to prefer sons over daughters in efforts to create more directed family resources. The result of the discrimination and male preference is a shortfall of women and an extremely unbalanced sex ratio in the population of China. China's sex-ratio is comparatively the most skewed of any country in the global sphere.

In December 2016, researchers at the University of Kansas reported that the missing women may be largely a result of administrative under-reporting and that delayed registration of females could account for as many as 10 to 15 million of the missing women since 1982.

Background 

Amartya Sen noticed that in China, rapid economic development went together with worsening female mortality and higher sex ratios. Although China has been traditionally discriminatory against women, a significant decline in China's female population happened after 1979, the year following implementation of economic and social reforms under Deng Xiaoping. Sen concluded that there were three reasons why the environment for Chinese women had deteriorated, particularly since 1979:

The one-child policy was implemented in 1979 in effort to control the size of families, which meant having a "one-child family" for most Chinese families, with some exceptions. Because of a strong son preference, these compulsory measures resulted in a neglect of girls and in some cases led to female infanticide. China did not appear to be systematizing sex-selective fertilization or pre-conception practices; it is therefore assumed that 10% of female children go missing at some point after conception: whether in utero, or throughout early infancy. Female infant mortality dramatically increased in the early years after the reforms in 1979, and some statistics imply that female infant mortality doubled from 1978 to 1984.

A general crisis in health services arose after economic reform as previously funding for China's extensive rural health care programs had largely come from agricultural production brigades and collectives. When the economic reforms abolished these traditional structures, they were replaced by the household-responsibility system, which meant that agriculture remained concentrated within the family and the availability of communal facilities in China's extensive rural health care system were restricted. Generally the effect of a restriction in medical services was neutral, but in a Chinese rural society that looked up to men and down on women, the reduction in health care services significantly affect women and female children.

The household-responsibility system involved a reduction of women's involvement in paid agricultural labor. At the same time, employment opportunities outside agriculture were generally scarce for women. According to Sen's cooperative conflicts approach, "who is doing productive work and who is contributing how much to the family's prosperity can be very influential", the effect of this systematic change on women within the household was negative, because women had fewer bargaining powers in their families. This reality motivated families to prefer boys over girls, which contributed to reduced care for female children.

Causes 
The causes of the high sex ratio in China result from a combination of strong son preference, the one-child policy, easy access to sex-selective abortion, food scarcity, and discrimination against and abuses of females.

Son preference in Chinese historical and traditional culture 

Son preference is traditional in Chinese Confucian patriarchal culture.  Sons are preferred for a number of reasons: people think sons continue the family line, carry on the family name, have a higher wage-earning capacity, provide ancestral worship, and are generally recipients of inheritance, while girls are often considered as an economic burden. After marriage they typically become members of their husband's family and cease to have responsibility for aging or ill parents.

With socioeconomic improvements, modernization and the rise in women's status, son preference has declined in many urban areas in China but has persisted in some strictly traditional families and rural areas, reasserting itself under the one-child policy. The greatest shortfalls of females appear in parts of rural China where there are instances of 140 male births for every 100 female.

20th Century Family Planning Measures 
Throughout his leadership from 1949 to 1976, Mao Zedong went back and forth between believing large populations to be a source of power, and recognizing the dangers of overpopulation. Though he considered economists' advice surrounding the possible establishment of a nationwide family planning organization in the mid-1950s, Mao later returned to advocating rapid population growth during the Great Leap Forward.

By the 1960s, when population growth rates surged after a nationwide famine, family planning commissions were instated throughout the country. Population control campaigns did not cover ground, however, until after 1971, when a number of voluntary measures such as later marriage ages, fixed intervals of years between births, and a limit of two children were advocated by the central government. After Mao's death, Deng Xiaoping rose to power in 1978. Under his leadership, contraceptive measures became priority policies in the context of family planning. Deng believed population control to be essential to economic growth, and went to extreme lengths surrounding reproductive control to achieve that goal. Amidst an urgent political culture of economic, developmental ambition, the government implemented the one-child policy in 1979.

One-child policy 

Throughout the 1970s, China experienced a significant population boom. In an effort to enhance environmental and economic conditions by limiting population growth, China implemented its one-child policy in 1979. The policy enacted a number of rules dictating the governmentally sanctioned composition of a Chinese family: each household was permitted one birth, and risked consequences ranging from fines to forced sterilization if they violated regulations. The policy was strictly enforced in urban areas where residential densities were usually higher, and its effects differed depending on the region: it was not heavily enforced among the country's ethnic minorities, and a number of exceptions were made among the majority Han population. Allowances were also made for families in which the first and only child had a disability.

Xuefeng Chen, director of the Chinese Children's Center in Beijing, stated "it is undeniable that single children will create a different society, we must first enhance single children's opportunities and abilities at social communication, interaction and development." Single children in China are deprived of the experiences undergone by their mothers and fathers. Their well-being is considered to be at risk; they may exhibit stereotypical behavior of single-children, or be characterized as spoiled, selfish and unsociable. The one child-policy has been called the "most momentous and far reaching in its implication for China's population and economic development." The reproductive freedoms of the Chinese population were utilized  as a political tool for social modernization.

The one-child policy highlighted a traditional preference for sons; its results included heightened rates of sex-selective abortion, female child abandonment and, in some cases, female infanticide. The policy also resulted in an increased underreporting of female births and adoptions. All of these factors contributed to the stark "missing women" phenomenon, whose social consequences can be observed in an overabundance of single men, and an increase in the kidnapping and trafficking of women for marriage and sex work.

The one-child policy was ended and replaced by a two-child policy in 2016 and replaced in turn by a three-child policy in 2021.

Food Scarcities 
One of the main factors that led to the creation of the One Child Policy was China’s insurmountable food scarcity, which gave its government the authority to have unprecedented amounts of power over rural communities and their land ownership. Following 1956, the state or local governments claimed ownership of all rural lands through mandatory forfeitures and below market-value compensations. As a result, farmers were limited in their ability to raise capital since they could not sell, rent, or buy land to make more economically viable tracts or use land as collateral for loans. The government's control over land also decreased individual incentive to work hard, as the farmers could not make a profit off of the crops they produced. Consequently, leading to large-scale starvation and a deepened divide between society's elite and its most vulnerable populations.

Food shortage issues were further worsened by the successive droughts in the Yellow River Basin, Southwest and Southern China, the North China Plain, and the Yangtze River from 1958 to 1960. All of which resulted in deplorable climate conditions for almost every region in China and triggered the Great Chinese Famine of 1959-1961.

Overall, the Chinese government played upon food scarcity to increase their power over previously open lands. In many cases, local political figures would draw on false promises of food security in order to manipulate their citizens into complying with the new regulations. However, the lack of food that gave the Communist Party more legitimacy and power also killed millions of people and  prompted the beginning of the One Child Policy.

Sources 
As a result of the one-child policy and traditional son preference, China's missing female population is formed through sex-selective abortion, discrimination in care for females, and non-registration of girls at birth.

Sex-selective abortion 

Son preference, the one-child policy, and prenatal sex-identifying technology have aided the spread of prenatal discrimination in parts of China where abortion is legal. Sex-selective abortive procedures result in an excess of male births, which then significantly skew sex ratios within a population. According to China Statistics Press 2013, China's sex ratio at birth was 111 in 1990, 117 in 2001, 121 in 2005 and 119 in 2010. Approximately 37-45% of China's missing women may have gone missing prior to birth.  Researchers found that sex-selective abortions can create long term social problems within populations. A dearth of women may be detrimental to gender equality: reduced populations of women wield reduced civic power. In regions where marriage is essential to social advancement, a shortage of brides and mothers may lead to an increase in kidnappings, forced marriages, and violence.

Some argue that sex-selective abortion has benefits.  Access to prenatal sex determination increases the desired birth of sons, thereby reducing post-birth discrimination against and abandonment of girls. India, South Korea and China have all reported lower female mortality in the last decade. It has also been argued that the scarcity of women leads to a greater valuing of the women who are born; their social status is heightened as a result. Sex selective abortion also empowers mothers to choose the sex of their child; due to son preference, a woman may gain familial recognition through her ability to produce a son.

Female infanticide at birth 

Female infanticide is the murder of baby girls due to a preference for male babies. Though newborn girls exercise a biological advantage over newborn boys in surviving their first year of life,  premature mortality incurred by infanticide, as well as malnutrition and healthcare neglect lead to a female infant mortality rate that outpaces that of males in China. Scholars found that, in some rural parts of China, "as many as half of all newborns were sometimes killed by their families."

As Sen points out, practices of female infanticide have occurred throughout Chinese history. The Great Chinese Famine during 19591961 led many families to choose female infanticide as a means of conserving food and resources. More recently, China's one-child policy played a major role in heightened rates of female infanticide. In September 1997, the World Health Organization's Regional Committee for the Western Pacific claimed that "more than 50 million women were estimated to be 'missing' in China because of the institutionalized killing and neglect of girls due to Beijing's population control program that limits parents to one child."

China's population control policy revealed strong, pre-existing cultural son preference, which broadened the disparity between comparative rates of male and female infanticide. Traditionally, daughters grow up to "marry out" and leave their families, whereas men remain financially useful for the rest of their lives. Girls are seen as burdens with little payoff, especially among many of China's neighboring countries. The Quan Han Shu mentions that no festivities were held when a daughter was born into a prosperous family, and that poor people did not even rear their female children.

In a recent Chinese natural survey in 2003, thirty-seven percent of young women, predominately urban, said they had no gender preference and forty-five percent reported their ideal family would consist of one boy and one girl. The elimination of female infants has contributed to the phenomenon known as, "missing women". Female infanticide, sex abortions, drowning, and withholding of health care and nutrition are possible consequences of the restrictive one-child policy.

Poor health care and malnutrition 

The neglect of proper health care and nutrition for girls and women contributes to missing women. Discrimination against daughters post-birth leads to poor health care and malnutrition, and, in many cases, premature death. For adult women, early-life conditions directly influence their health and mortality later in life.  According to Chinese traditions, the period of zuò yuèzi (坐月子), or the first 30 or 40 postnatal days, is an essential convalescence for mothers to ensure their future health.  If they are not given support or taken care of within this period of time (e.g., some rural women do heavy farm work within zuò yuèzi), potential risks include health complications and early death.

Contraceptive use 

In an attempt to control the country's population in 2015, the Chinese government expanded  opportunities for contraceptive use. "20 years ago if you went to the rural villages, you could see the slogans on the wall that read, 'If you have one child, IUD please, if you have two children, sterilization please," said Kaining Zhang, a research physician at the Yunnan Health and Development Research Association. "There is still a very strong influence [from that] policy." The attitudes towards reproductive heath have dramatically changed throughout the country. Sexual health was oftentimes something kept private and not openly discussed. A survey conducted by Renmin University in 2015 states that more than half of the respondents think premarital sex is acceptable. The traditional views on sexual health, contraception are rapidly changing affecting primarily the young and unmarried generation.

China has one of the highest rates of contraceptive use in the world, even in comparison to other Asian countries. Among 84.6% women who are currently married or in union are using a form of contraception. The United States has a lower rate of 78.6%. Japan, a neighboring country has reports as low as 54.3% prevalence. The one-child policy enacted in 1979 is the primary contributor of increased contraceptive use. In attempt to really decrease the population, China's family planning policies actually emphasize birth control and many forms are available both in urban and rural areas for free. The strict implications of the one-child policy did allow for many women to receive birth control methods however it typically only benefits those who are married. The young population who is not covered are not married and therefore fall into the gap of unintended pregnancy. The National Population and Family Planning Commission did however oversee China's views by making improvements with the increased access to birth control, and also sex education. Providing women with the access and social support of contraceptive use not only allows for population control, but allows families to analyze their option before considering abortion options. The International Family Planning Perspectives states, "the effect of sex preference on childbearing is becoming stronger as fertility declines, because couples must achieve their desired number of sons within a smaller overall number of children." Although contraceptives aren't always related to sex preference, "an improvement in the status of women and female children should be helpful in reducing son preference and improvement in maternal and child health and family planning services should be helpful in reducing the number of abortions in the country." Access to prenatal sex determination will lead to an increase number of wanted births, leading to less discrimination against girls and a lower overall female mortality rate. Fewer sex-selective abortions and reduced son will reduce son preference and create less participation in sex-selective abortions which would ultimately level the imbalanced sex ratio.

Non-registration of female babies at birth 

Some of the missing women in China result from under-reporting and non-registration of baby girls. The family planning policy is disproportionately implemented across China, especially in rural areas. In order to leave themselves opportunities to have sons and avoid paying penalties on over-quota children, some parents in rural areas of China will not register their female babies, leading to a shortfall of girls registered as residents. Although it is the responsibility of the village leaders to enforce the policy, they will under report the number of births so they will not face penalties from higher authorities.

Consequences of the phenomenon

Wifeless men 

Since prenatal sex determination became available in the mid-1980s, China has witnessed large cohorts of surplus males who were born at that time and are now of marriageable age.
The estimated excess males are 2.3, 2.7, and 2.1 million in the years 2011, 2012 and 2013 respectively.  Over the next 20 years, a predicted excess of 10–20% of young men will emerge in large parts of China. These marriageable-age husbands-to-be, known as guang gun, translated as "bare branches" or "bare sticks", live in societies where marriage is considered as part of an individual's social status. Prenatal sex determination along with China's traditional preference for sons over daughters has left millions of men to compete over a limited number of brides, a phenomenon known as the marriage squeeze. On occasion, families would adopt female infants as a way to secure a future bride for their sons. These girls would be raised by their adoptive families to learn how to care and serve their future families.

An additional problem is that since women tend to marry men in higher socioeconomic groups than their own, the shortage of women in the marriage market will leave the least desirable, the poorest, and uneducated men with no marriage prospects.

Some commentators worry that those left wifeless men may be marginalized as being single is barely socially acceptable in a Chinese cultural context. These wifeless men's lives could be seriously influenced by how the public view them. They may have senses of loneliness, self-failure and uselessness and be prone to psychological problems. There is also a possibility of these young men emigrating out of mainland China to other countries with more women (like Ukraine, Russia, and most of the West), if the problem continues to persist.

An alternative viewpoint suggests that the shortfall of women might have some positive effects on society. Facing declining possibilities of finding wives, men among the surplus cohort are more eager to improve their competitiveness in the marriage market. Some are more willing to take unpleasant or dangerous hard work, thereby providing more labor. They hope that the wealthier they become,  the more competitive they will be in finding a wife.

Propensity to violence 

The future social effect of the guang gun remains a topic of concern. The majority of Chinese think that the guang gun are likely to affect criminal behavior.  An early commentator predicted that, "such sexual crimes as forced marriages, girls stolen for wives, bigamy, visiting prostitutes, rape, adultery... homosexuality... and weird sexual habits appear to be unavoidable."  Annual province-level data for the years 19882004 has showed that a 1% increase in the sex ratio is followed by a 3% increase in violent and property crime rates, meaning that unmarried men might account for part of the rise in crime. Conversely, marriage reduces male criminality.  A study in China found that people share the same concerns: 65% of 7435 people of reproductive age think crime will increase, 53% are worried about the less safe streets, 60% consider these excess men as a threat to societal stability, and 56% believe the imbalanced sex-ratio will result in an increase in prostitution and trafficking.

Opposing voices argue that no evidence appears to support these worries. After comparing high and low sex ratio areas, crime in areas with more men tended to be no higher than areas with low sex ratios.  Also, in comparison with other countries, the crime rates are relatively low in China.

Sex trafficking of women 

China's shortage of women is increasing demand for brides among guang guan (single men). Experts estimate that by 2030, 25 percent of Chinese men in their late 30s will remain unmarried due to the missing women phenomenon. Families in more rural parts of China resort to buying and selling kidnapped brides and forcing them to bear their sons' children. Brides are sometimes kidnapped from across the border in Myanmar, Burma.  Trafficked women are subjected to sexual, physical, and emotional abuse, forced labor, and, in some cases, forced medications intended to improve fertility. If captors are more interested in having children, women are sometimes released, provided they leave behind the children they have while imprisoned. The majority of abducted women are between the ages of 13 and 24. Law enforcement often ignore missing women reports, and sometimes make families pay to find their daughters and wives. Escaped trafficking victims face immigration law violations under Chinese officials, as well as social stigma when they return to their communities.

Abandonment of infant girls 

Under the one-child policy, some Chinese parents in rural areas abandon their very young daughters in order to increase the possibility of raising a son.  More than 95% of babies in state-owned orphanages are healthy baby girls, while a high percentage of these abandoned girls die within couple of months because of the poor conditions and health neglect in orphanages. Those parents who abandon their girl children leave their children either not far from their homes or close to public places to make sure that the babies can be found. According to an official in Liaoning province, "Every year, no fewer than 20 abandoned baby girls are found in dustbins and corners."

Prevalence of sex workers 

One potential problem with a large number of wifeless men is that many millions of Chinese sex workers appear to represent a broad range of backgrounds. Although prostitution is illegal in China, there may appear expansion of female sex workers to meet increased demand of wifeless men. In China, the female sex work industry has flourished in the 20th century.

The number of female sex workers in China increased from 25,000 in 1985 to 420,000 in 1996. It was estimated by the Chinese Public Security Bureau that there were 46 million sex workers in China by 2000.  The U.S. State Department estimated in 2001 that there were 10 million sex workers in China.

Potential risk of HIV 

In recent years, surplus men have come into the HIV risk sphere. Research suggests that the combined effects of sexual practices, sex work, and surplus males probably have effects on HIV transmission. As a result, young, poor, unmarried surplus men could become a significant new HIV risk group. Before these men find wives, they may be at greater risk of infection with HIV from female sex workers in urban areas.

According to the police surgeon and municipal health officer for Shanghai, the spread of sexually transmitted infection has a close relationship with young unmarried men. For most unmarried migrant workers in China, there is a substantial gap between HIV knowledge and infrequent condom use. Based on a sample of 506 migrants, about half of them had multiple sex partners and 89% of these migrants did not use condoms.

Fertility rate 
In 1965, fourteen years before the one-child policy was implemented, China's fertility rate was 6.39 births per women. After the one-child policy in 1979, the fertility rate dropped to 2.75 births per women and quickly continued to fall in the years to come. Initially, China's goal was to get the fertility rate down to the replacement level of 2.1 births per women, but the fertility rate continued to fall and it is now at 1.6 births per women.

Demographers warn that fertility rates this low can hinder the development of a country and China has started to change their policies in order to increase their fertility rate and avoid any future adversaries. In 2015, the Chinese government decided to change the one-child policy and implemented a two-child policy. Some researchers argue that son preference along with the one-child policy are one of the many contributing factors to an imbalanced sex ratio that has left millions of unmarried men unable to marry and start a family.

Scholars and journalists from outside of China argue that simply dropping the one-child policy will help raise the number of girls born into China and thus raise the future fertility rate. Even though the two-child policy is now in act, couples are still choosing to remain a single-child household due to expensive childcare and women's increasing hesitance to leave their careers to raise a family.

Aging population 

Large numbers of missing women also contribute to the problem of population ageing in China. Since females and males together are responsible for the social reproduction, a shortfall of women will lead to a reduction in the number of current and future newborns, ultimately accelerating the aging problem in China. According to forecasts, based on the current sex ratio the elderly population in China will increase by about 3% annually for the next 30 years. People over 65 in China will account for 15% of the population between 2025 and 2030, while those over 60 will account for a quarter of the population in 2050. This rapidly increasing elderly population will also aggravate the social burden of the pension insurance system.

Economic effects 
The long term economic outcomes of China's missing women phenomenon are a source of diverse debate. Some scholars argue that, in the short term, declining fertility rates create an advantageous ratio of abundant producers to smaller populations who rely on that productivity (children, infants, pregnant women etc.). However, others argue that over time, as economically productive populations age, the number of dependents decreases and ratios tilt the other way.

Reactions

Change in laws and policies 

To control the imbalanced sex ratio, which is caused by the combined effects of son preference, sex-selective abortion and one-child policy, the Chinese government has taken some effective measures. Laws forbidding infanticide, abandonment, and neglect of female children already exist.  There are also penalties for trafficking and kidnapping.  The Chinese government has also published laws forbidding foetal sex determination and sex-selective abortion.

China has recruited unmarried young males from poor backgrounds into the People's Liberation Army and into the paramilitary People's Armed Police.

Improving women's status can also help reduce the sex ratio at birth. The Chinese government pays more attention to women's legal rights, especially their economic development. More emphasis has been placed on forming laws and regulations for women's economic status, education opportunities, inheritance of family property, willingness of marriage, and old-age supports.

From 2005, 600 Chinese yuan per month is given as a pension to parents in rural areas who have daughters.  In 2000, in order to establish a better survival environment for girls in Chaohu city, Anhui province, the "Chaohu Experimental Zone Improving Girl-Child Survival Environment" was established and implemented in 2003. The main activities were "establishing specialized organizations, conducting trainings, punishing those found to be committing non-medical sex-selective abortions and infanticide, advocating for regulations and laws addressing gender equality, holding focus-group discussions for mothers-in-law, helping women to participate in socioeconomic activities by providing economic support, encouraging active male participation in the improvement of women's status, enhancing the social-security system, and popularizing uxorilocal marriages (in which husbands marry into wives' birth families), in addition to other activities."  The outcomes after three years were encouraging: the sex ratio at birth declined from more than 125 in 1999 to 114 in 2002. Based on this program, in 2003, the Population and Family Planning Commission initiated a campaign called "Care for Girls" to encourage couples to consider the advantages of having girl children.  The results were also significant: a survey in 2007 showed that son preference had decreased in participating areas and the sex ratio at birth in the rural of Shanxi province fell from 135 in 2003 to 118 in 2007.

Two-child policy 

At the beginning of 2017, the Chinese government modified its family planning laws to finally allow married couples to have a second child. In 2016 the National Health and Family Planning Commission of China reported that live births in national hospitals numbered 18.46 million and that the fertility rate reached 1.7 percent, the highest rate since 2000. The effect of the new policy to relax birth-planning regulations has debunked 400 million averted births. Since the policy has been enacted, 261.4 million unregistered people who have lived at their residence for at least 6 months were found. The policy change has taken pressure off parents to participate in sex-selective abortion or even avoiding registering female babies at birth, as they now have room for two children. The implementation of the two-child policy has given families room to grow but also control population in the country, in a managed and more humane way. Although the two-child policy was implemented, the 35-year old social policy is unlikely to take part in a baby boom, in attempt to spark economic growth. The country is believed to be a true single-society even when given the option to take part in extending their family count. The two-child policy is not expected to serve as a baby boom, rather a moderate increase in fertility among Chinese women. There are still effects resulting from the one-child policy which the two-child policy is intended to attempt to reverse, including population aging, reduction in sex ratio birth, more oppressive elements of child policy, contributions to economic growth and allow freedom to couples to have their desired number of children.

Policy responses 

Although there is extensive damage to the gender ratio throughout the country, it is still possible to implement change to benefit future generations of the country. According to the Canadian Medical Association, it is crucial to both outlaw sex selection and fix the primary issue of son preference. Many laws already forbid fetal sex determination throughout countries in Asia, including China, but still continues to be a problem. Establishing responsibility to those performing illegal acts such as abortion is one step closer to ensuring a healthy, family oriented society. Holding doctors, clinics and establishments accountable by law is believed to make astounding differences in the sex preference.

Son preference as a whole, is largely challenging in the country. It is primarily important to spread public awareness though campaigns, media, and posters including advantages of females. The results of many campaigns such as the "Care for Girls" campaign on China, by the National Population and Family Planning Commission, encourages female births and requests participation from many neighboring countries. In one of the participating counties in Shanxi providence, the sex ratio birth was reduced from 135 in the year 2003 to 117 just three years later. The country must implement a less traditional form of gender approach and encourage women for higher status positions in society. The Chinese government is essential in improving their gender and social rights. In 1992, the Law on the Protection of Rights and Interests of Women ensured women equal rights among politics, culture, education, work property rights and even marriage. Evidence shows that a country who supports higher status of women leads to a less traditional view of gender and lowers the level of son preference. All these socioeconomic improvements have led to a steer away from traditional views of women to a more modern approach, working to end the gender gap in entirety.

Change in attitudes 
Although China's sex ratio at birth is still one of the highest in the world, growing evidence has shown that son preference in China is declining.  In recent interviews, many young Chinese adults expressed the view that they do not care about the gender of their future child, even though son preference was common in their parents' generation.  A recent study showed that among the 34% who do not claim to be gender indifferent, 13% (10% urban 16% rural) prefer a boy, and 21% (22% urban and 18% rural) want a girl. Hesketh points out that with the consideration of advantages of raising girls, including that they are easier to care for, easier to find a spouse for, and take good care of aging parents, gender indifference and girl preference increase in comparison with previous son preference.

In the context of lower fertility and birth rates within China, the politics of gender equality have undergone an ambiguous, yet palpable change. With lower numbers of children requiring domestic responsibility, it might be assumed that women are able to break out of the childcare roles expected of them more often. However, studies have shown that social pressures placed on a single child limit (i.e. the tendency to view ones only child as the "be-all-end-all" heir on which the success of the family hinges) have created social pressures on mothers as well. Furthermore, lower fertility rates and higher rates of education work against the decline of Chinese cultural son preferences, which in turn create a more imbalanced sex ratio.  Before the one child policy, with the advent of family planning, the encouragement of later marriages, lowered fertility rates, and more men than women also increased female sex trafficking; prostitution could be seen as a source of income for families with a single female child, or an opportunity for forced marriage in the case of wifeless men.

See also 
 Abortion in China
 Female infanticide in China
 Feminism in China
 List of Chinese administrative divisions by gender ratio
 One-child policy
 Prostitution in China
 Rural society in the People's Republic of China
 Sex trafficking in China
 Urban society in the People's Republic of China 
 Women's healthcare in the People's Republic of China

General
 Sex-selective abortion
 Women in China
 Missing women of Asia

References 

Women's rights in China
Sex selection in China